Mizanur Rahman Sayed is a Bangladeshi Islamic scholar. He was one of the five scholars selected by Islamic Foundation Bangladesh as Fatwa interpreters.

Education
Rahman attended Al-Jamiah Al-Ashrafiyyah in Fulgazi, Feni District before moving on to Al-Jamiah Al-Islamiah Patiya and Al-Jamiatul Ahlia Darul Ulum Moinul Islam for secondary education. He then attended Darul Uloom Karachi for higher study. There he studied Dawra-e-Hadith and specialized in Islamic Law and Fiqh. He also gained a diploma in Arabic Literature from Imam Muhammad ibn Saud Islamic University, Riyadh.

Career
Sayed is the founding principal of Farukia Islamia Madrasah, Feni. He serves as the education secretary of Islamic Research Center Bangladesh for a few years. On 26 January 2012, he established the Sheikh Zakariyyah Islamic Research Center, where he is the head and chief mufti. He also serves as the Sheikhul Hadeeth of Al-Madrasatul Arabia Baitussalam, Uttara, Dhaka.

References

External links
 Mufti Yousuf Sultan
 Mufti Saeed Ahmad

1955 births
Al Jamia Al Islamia Patiya alumni
Bangladeshi Islamic religious leaders
Bangladeshi Sunni Muslim scholars of Islam
Darul Uloom Hathazari Alumni
Deobandis
Living people
People from Fulgazi Upazila
Sunni Islamists
Sunni imams
Students of Muhammad Taqi Usmani
20th-century Bengalis
21st-century Bengalis